Vitor Hugo Roque Ferreira (born 28 February 2005), known as Vitor Roque, is a Brazilian footballer who plays as a forward for Brasileirão club Athletico Paranaense.

Club career

Early career
Born in Timóteo, Minas Gerais, Vitor Roque joined América Mineiro's youth setup at the age of ten, and impressed with the side's youth categories in 2018. In March 2019, he signed a youth contract with Cruzeiro, which led América to sue his new club in the State Labour Department; both clubs only reached an agreement in May, with Cruzeiro retaining 65% of the player's economic rights, and América keeping the other 35%.

Cruzeiro
On 25 May 2021, Vitor Roque signed his first professional contract with Cruzeiro. He made his professional debut on 12 October; after coming on as a second-half substitute for Bruno José in a 0–0 Série B home draw against Botafogo, he played for 18 minutes before being himself replaced by Keké, with manager Vanderlei Luxemburgo saying that he was "unable to keep the pace" but also "praising for his debut".

Already a part of the first team for the 2022 season, Vitor Roque scored his first goal on 20 February of that year, netting the club's first in a 2–2 Campeonato Mineiro home draw against Villa Nova. Three days later, he scored a brace in a 5–0 away routing over Sergipe in the Copa do Brasil.

Athletico Paranaense

On 13 April 2022, Vitor Roque signed a five-year contract with Athletico Paranaense, after the club activated his R$ 24 million release clause; it was the biggest transfer of the club's history.

Career statistics

Honours
Individual
 Copa Libertadores Team of the Tournament: 2022

Brazil U20
2023 South American U-20 Championship

References

External links

2005 births
Living people
Sportspeople from Minas Gerais
Brazilian footballers
Association football forwards
Campeonato Brasileiro Série A players
Campeonato Brasileiro Série B players
Cruzeiro Esporte Clube players
Club Athletico Paranaense players
Brazil youth international footballers
Brazil under-20 international footballers